'Making Their Mark' is an Australian sports documentary that follows several players and staff from six different clubs that competed in the 2020 Australian Football League season that was impacted by the COVID-19 pandemic. The seven episodes are composed of footage taken from 2500 hours of film, shot over seven months. Not only does the series cover day-to-day aspects of a footballer's professional life, it also encompasses themes of leadership, grief and racism. Critical reception of the series was generally favourable and Scott Hines stated it was worth streaming, even for an American audience.

The series stars Eddie Betts and Nic Naitanui who were recorded almost continuously, who represented the Carlton and West Coast Eagles football clubs respectively. Stephen Coniglio and Rory Sloane are also filmed extensively as well as Gold Coast Suns football club coach Stuart Dew, and staff leaders Peggy O'Neal, Damien Hardwick and Brendon Gale of the Richmond Football Club. Richmond's president, O'Neal, commented that it was a "wonderful opportunity" and that when filming was agreed to they would have "no idea" the COVID-19 pandemic would have such an impact. Leon Cameron features in the series extensively and stated that he watched some of the uncomfortable moments of the show with the GWS Giants' captain, Coniglio, in private.

Making Their Mark was produced in Australia by JAM TV and Den of Martians and was released on 12 March 2021 by Amazon Prime Video.

References 

Amazon Prime Video original programming
2020 in Australian rules football
2020 Australian Football League season
2020s Australian documentary television series
Documentary television series about sports
COVID-19 pandemic in Australia
Television shows about the COVID-19 pandemic